Finney County (county code FI) is a county located in the U.S. state of Kansas. As of the 2020 census, the county population was 38,470. In 2020, 51.4 percent of the population in the county was Hispanic and Finney was one of the few counties in Kansas with an Hispanic majority population. Its county seat and most populous city is Garden City.

History
Finney County began about 1880 as Buffalo County and Sequoyah County, named after Sequoyah, the Cherokee Indian responsible for the development of the Cherokee alphabet. The two counties were renamed Finney County in honor of then Lieutenant Governor David Wesley Finney. The county grew to the current shape after Garfield County was annexed to it in 1893. The northeast block, separate from the otherwise rectangular area, represents what at one time was Garfield County, which is now occupied partially by the Garfield Township.

Charles "Buffalo" Jones, a co-founder of Garden City, was the first member of the Kansas House of Representatives from Finney County. He was known for his efforts to preserve the buffalo from extinction.

Between 2007 and 2008 Finney County became majority-minority.

Geography
It is the second-largest county in Kansas by area.

Adjacent counties

 Scott County (north)
 Lane County (north)
 Ness County (northeast)
 Hodgeman County (east)
 Haskell County (south)
 Gray County (south)
 Grant County (southwest)
 Kearny County (west)

Demographics

Finney County is included in the Garden City, KS Micropolitan Statistical Area.

2010 Census
As of the 2010 census there were 36,776 people, 12,359 households and 8,903 families living in the county. The racial makeup of the county was 77.0% White, 2.3% Black or African American, 0.9% Native American, 3.4% Asian, 0.0% Pacific Islander, 13.6% from other races, and 2.9% from two or more races. Hispanic or Latino of any race were 46.7% of the population.

2000 Census
As of the 2000 census, there were 40,523 people, 12,948 households, and 9,749 families living in the county.  The population density was 31 people per square mile (12/km2).  There were 13,763 housing units at an average density of 11 per square mile (4/km2).  The racial makeup of the county was 69.05% White, 1.25% Black or African American, 0.96% Native American, 2.87% Asian, 0.08% Pacific Islander, 22.99% from other races, and 2.80% from two or more races. Hispanic or Latino of any race were 43.30% of the population.

There were 12,948 households, out of which 46.00% had children under the age of 18 living with them, 59.80% were married couples living together, 10.50% had a female householder with no husband present, and 24.70% were non-families. 19.60% of all households were made up of individuals, and 6.30% had someone living alone who was 65 years of age or older.  The average household size was 3.09 and the average family size was 3.55.

In the county, the population was spread out, with 34.30% under the age of 18, 11.00% from 18 to 24, 31.10% from 25 to 44, 16.60% from 45 to 64, and 7.00% who were 65 years of age or older.  The median age was 28 years. For every 100 females there were 104.20 males.  For every 100 females age 18 and over, there were 103.30 males.

The median income for a household in the county was $38,474, and the median income for a family was $42,839. Males had a median income of $29,948 versus $21,510 for females. The per capita income for the county was $15,377.  About 10.00% of families and 14.20% of the population were below the poverty line, including 18.60% of those under age 18 and 10.70% of those age 65 or over.

Government

Presidential election results
Finney County has primarily supported Republican presidential candidates throughout its history. In only six elections from 1884 to the present has the county not backed the Republican candidate, the last of these being in 1976 when Jimmy Carter won the county by only 102 votes.

Laws
Finney County was a prohibition, or "dry", county until the Kansas Constitution was amended in 1986 and voters approved the sale of alcoholic liquor by the individual drink with a 30% food sales requirement.

Education

Unified school districts
 Holcomb USD 363
 Garden City USD 457

Communities

Cities
 Garden City
 Holcomb

Unincorporated communities
† means a Census-Designated Place (CDP) by the United States Census Bureau.
 Friend
 Gano
 Kalvesta
 Lowe
 Mansfield
 Peterson
 Pierceville†
 Plymell
 Quinby
 Ritchal
 Rodkey
 Tennis
 Wolf

Ghost towns
 Eminence
 Ravanna

Townships
Finney County is divided into seven townships.  The city of Garden City is considered governmentally independent and is excluded from the census figures for the townships.  In the following table, the population center is the largest city (or cities) included in that township's population total, if it is of a significant size.

See also

 Golden Triangle of Meat-packing 
 National Register of Historic Places listings in Finney County, Kansas

References

Notes

Further reading

 Plat Book of Finney County, Kansas; Western Publishing Company; 50 pages; 1910.

External links

County
 
 Finney County - Directory of Public Officials
Other
 Finney County Public Library 
Maps
 Finney County Maps: Current, Historic, KDOT
 Kansas Highway Maps: Current, Historic, KDOT
 Kansas Railroad Maps: Current, 1996, 1915, KDOT and Kansas Historical Society

 
Kansas counties
1883 establishments in Kansas
Populated places established in 1883